This list ranks skyscrapers by height which were designed by women working as primary architects or design coordinators. Only buildings with continuously occupiable floors are included, thus non-building structures, including towers, are not included. (See List of tallest buildings and structures.)

Ranking criteria 
Note that many of these buildings are designed by larger teams that include the female architects listed.

Tallest buildings in the world designed by women (50m+)

Gallery

Buildings under construction 
This is a list of buildings taller than 50 meters designed by women that are currently under construction.

See also 

 History of the world's tallest buildings
 Women in architecture
 List of women architects
 List of tallest buildings by height to roof
 List of architects of supertall buildings
 List of cities with the most skyscrapers
 List of future tallest buildings
 List of tallest buildings and structures
 List of largest buildings
 List of tallest hotels
 List of tallest residential buildings
 List of tallest structures
 Skyscraper Index

References

External links
 Council on Tall Buildings and Urban Habitat
 Emporis, international database and gallery of buildings
 Structurae, international database and gallery of structures
 BuildingHeights.org, alternative ranking of the world's 1000 tallest buildings

Tallest, women
Women

Buildings

`